The Yamaha MT-07 (called FZ-07 in North America until 2017) is a MT series standard motorcycle or UJM with a  liquid-cooled 4 stroke and 8 valve DOHC parallel-twin cylinder with crossplane crankshaft, manufactured by Yamaha Motor Company from 2014 and US release in 2015. As of 2018, the bike is designated MT-07 in all markets.

For the Australian and New Zealand markets, the bike is available in  Learner Approved Motorcycle Scheme (LAMS) version for riders on Learner and Restricted licences.

Design and development 
In most respects, the MT-07 is a conventional middleweight naked bike. It uses a compact tubular backbone frame. Its rear monoshock unit is placed horizontally within the subframe to give a shorter wheelbase, to save weight and to lower the centre of gravity. The front forks are conventional telescopic items, whereas its 3-cylinder sibling, the MT-09, has inverted forks. The anti-lock braking system is available as an option on 2015–2017 models, but became standard equipment in 2018.

Both the MT-07 and the MT-09 are base models from which a range of derivative bikes was intended to follow. Yamaha commissioned designer Shinya Kimura to create a café racer special based on the MT-07. In June 2015, Kimura revealed the machine, which he called "Faster Son". Motorcycle News said that they expected Yamaha to announce a production version based on "Faster Son" in late 2015. The Yamaha XSR700 was launched for the 2016 model year based on the MT-07. The Yamaha Ténéré 700, which shares the CP2 engine with the MT-07, was launched for the 2019 model year.

Reception 
The MT-07 received positive reviews from motorcycling journalists. In The Daily Telegraph, Roland Brown rated the bike at five out of five stars, praising the engine, handling, value for money and overall riding experience, while criticising the front brake, calling it "adequate but less powerful than is suggested by its superbike-style specification of twin discs and four-piston Monobloc calipers". Motorcycle News awarded five stars also, praising the light weight and engine response, although noting that "at high speed it will start to get breathless".

Motorcycle Consumer News declared the engine response "remarkable for its smoothness"; and their dynamometer tests showed rear wheel horsepower of  @ 9,200 rpm, and torque at  @ 6,600 rpm. Motorcycle Consumer News suspected the poor braking was down to the Michelin Pilot Road 3 tyres; and they recommended buyers to wait until Bridgestone BT023 tyres were OE items.

References

External links 

 Yamaha MT-07: Review at SuperBike
 Yamaha FZ-07: Review at Cycle World

MT-07
Standard motorcycles
Motorcycles introduced in 2014
Motorcycles powered by straight-twin engines